The Jersey official football team represents the British Crown Dependency of Jersey in non-FIFA international matches.

The Jersey Football Association is affiliated to the English Football Association, as they are not affiliated to either FIFA or UEFA, the Jersey official football team is therefore not eligible to take part in qualification for both the FIFA World Cup and the European Football Championship.

In December 2015 an application was submitted to UEFA to allow Jersey to take part in international matches, following on from Gibraltar's admission two years earlier. In October 2016, Jersey's bid to join UEFA was rejected, but this decision was appealed to the Court of Arbitration for Sport (CAS) in June 2017. In September 2017, the CAS ordered the UEFA Congress to hear Jersey's case. In February 2018 a majority of the member associations of UEFA voted against admitting Jersey as a member. An independent Parishes of Jersey team subsequently formed in August 2018, joining ConIFA in September that year.

Jersey Men's Team main fixtures are currently the annual Muratti Vase against fellow Channel Islanders Alderney and Guernsey, as well as the biennial Island Games.

Current squad

The following 16 players were called up to play in the 2018 Muratti Vase Final against Guernsey  in May 2018

 

|-
|}

Recent call-ups
The following players have also been called up to the Jersey squad within the last twelve months.

|-
|}

Honours 
Muratti Vase: 56 (55 outright, 1 shared)
1908, 1910, 1911, 1921, 1924, 1926, 1928, 1931, 1937*, 1939, 1947, 1948, 1949, 1953, 1955, 1956, 1958, 1959, 1960, 1961, 1962, 1963, 1964, 1965, 1967, 1968, 1970, 1971, 1973, 1976, 1977, 1981, 1982, 1984, 1986, 1987, 1989, 1990, 1993, 1994, 1995, 1996, 1998, 2000, 2002, 2003, 2004, 2006, 2007, 2008, 2009, 2011, 2015, 2016, 2018, 2019, 2022 (* shared)
 Island Games: 3
1993, 1997, 2009
 FA Inter League Champions
2021

Youth teams
Jersey under 16 have competed in their own Muratti Cup since 2007.

HonoursU-16 Muratti Cup: 2007, 2008, 2009, 2010, 2014, 2015 (shared), 2016, 2018, 2019, 2022

Women's team
The Jersey official women's team also compeated in their version on the Muratti Vase from its institution in 1997 to the 2017 when the Gurnsey women's team was disbanded.

HonoursIsland Games: 2015Muratti Cup:''' 2002, 2003, 2004, 2005, 2006, 2007, 2009, 2010, 2011, 2012, 2013, 2014, 2015, 2016, 2022

See also
Parishes of Jersey football team
Jersey Bulls F.C.

References

External links 
List of matches in Roon Ba

National team
European national and official selection-teams not affiliated to FIFA
F